Crowdfunded satellites are artificial satellites that have been funded by using crowdfunding, rather than more traditional methods of financing.

Several crowdfunded satellites have been launched in the 2010s, including SkyCube, KickSat, ArduSat, all of which resulted from successful Kickstarter campaigns, and the Russian Mayak, which used the Russian Boomstarter platform. Crowdfunded satellites are an example of public participation to research.

References 

Satellites
Satellites
Citizen science
Crowdfunded science